Edward Merrill Root (January 4, 1895 – October 26, 1973), was an American educator and poet devoted to anti-communist causes.

Biography
Root was born in Baltimore, Maryland, the son of a Congregationalist Church minister. In 1917, he graduated from Amherst College in Amherst, Massachusetts, where he studied under Robert Frost.

Root was a conscientious objector during World War I. He went to France with the American Friends Service Committee, saw action as an ambulance driver and returned to the United States to study at Andover Theological Seminary, the University of Missouri, and Harvard.

In 1920, he began working at Earlham College in Richmond, Indiana, as a professor of English literature, where his tenure lasted until his retirement in 1960. While working at Earlham, Root, who had been a devout Quaker and pacifist, emerged as a conservative advocate. 

In 1952, Root wrote "Darkness at Noon in American Colleges", an article warning parents of the "polio of collectivism" at American colleges and universities. He then wrote the book Collectivism on the Campus, alleging communism was widespread at colleges, and a few years later, Brainwashing in the High Schools: An Examination of Eleven American History Textbooks. The latter book brought Root fame in conservative circles.

Root became a member of the Textbook Evaluation Committee of Operation Textbook, sponsored by America's Future under the direction of Lucille Cardin Crain. The committee adopted DAR resolutions "as a yard-stick" to ascertain a textbook's acceptability. Any book failing to present the American Republic and U.S. Constitution in a favorable light received negative reviews.

Other members of the Textbook Evaluation Committee, in 1959, were:

 Neil Carothers, PhD (1884–1965)
 Medford Stanton Evans, PhD (1934–2015)
 Albert Hoyt Hobbs, PhD (1910–1994)
 Willmoore Kendall, PhD (1909–1967)
 Russell Kirk (1918–1994), MA, D. Litt.
 Ella Lonn (1979–1962), PhD
 Marie Regina Madden, PhD (1887–1973)
 J.B. Matthews (1894–1966)
 William Montgomery McGovern, PhD (1897–1964)
 Felix Morley, PhD (1894–1982)
 Charles Callan Tansill, PhD (1890–1964)

Root was one of the founders and original contributors to National Review, famously squaring off against Whittaker Chambers in reviews of novels by Ayn Rand in which Root defended her as a brilliantly gifted artist against Chambers' complaint that as a militant atheist she should be driven from the nascent conservative movement. In retirement, Root withdrew from the masthead of National Review and became an editor of the monthly American Opinion magazine of the John Birch Society, as well as continuing his editorial relationship with The American Friend, The Measure, and Quaker Life.  His book America's Steadfast Dream, published in 1971, is an anthology of twenty-five essays that appeared in American Opinion over a period of a decade.

Root published 11 books of poetry, which were praised; his former teacher, Robert Frost, called Root "the second best poet in America". He also wrote a biography of Frank Harris.

Root's central philosophy was what he called "Essentialism". His intention was " to make coherent and affirmative a certain philosophy, and American philosophy, and to do so in terms of art." He stated his philosophy thus:

"More and more as my life has matured, I have realized that by fundamental nature I am a conservative. I have realized that I wish to preserve the roots of life whence grow the blossoms and the fruits of life, and that I have become a genuine radical - i.e., one who works with the roots of life, laboring to set them more firmly and to nourish them more richly. I applaud fruitful change that comes from an enhancement and intensification of the last things that maintain their continuity with first things. But, as I see it, such change must be growth from within, so that you and I and our nation become ever more clearly, more richly, more truly, what we always are, potentially in principle. Man is ever seeking novelty; God is forever and ever making things new. He does not make the seasons, nor the rose, nor the Labrador retriever, nor the lover nor the poet, novel - He makes them new. And because they are new in their fundamental being, they are vitally old; as tomorrow's sunrise will be the newest of dawns and the oldest of dawns, since it shone upon the Birthday of Creation." 

For the individual, Root stated his philosophy as a person's "outermost expression of his innermost essence ... Man, being finite in existence, but infinite in essence, succeeds by reaching his highest point of failure."

He died at age 78 in 1973 in a Portland, Maine, hospital.

Selected work

Prose 

 "The Culture of Abundance" (1938)
Brainwashing in the High Schools (1958)
Collectivism on the Campus
America's Steadfast Dream
Frank Harris: A Biography
The Way of All Spirit

Poetry 

Lost Eden
Bow of Burning Gold
Dawn is Forever
Before the Swallow Dares
The Seeds of Time
Ulysses To Penelope
Out Of Our Winter
The Light Wind Over
Shoulder the Sky
Of Perilous Seas
Like White Birds Flying
Children of the Morning

See also 
 Technocracy
 First New Right (United States)

Bibliography

Annotations

Notes

References

References by Root 

  (publication);  (article).
  (publication);  (publication).
 .
<ol type="i" start="1">
The author dedicated the book to his four grandchildren:
<li> 
<li> 

<li> Leslie
<li> Stephen Hugh O'Kane (1957–1969)

1895 births
1973 deaths
20th-century American educators
20th-century American poets
John Birch Society members
Writers from Baltimore
Writers from Richmond, Indiana
Amherst College alumni
Andover Newton Theological School alumni
Earlham College faculty
American Quakers
American male poets
New Right (United States)
20th-century American male writers
American anti-communists
American male non-fiction writers
American political activists
American political writers